With Prejudice is a 1983 Australian film directed by Esben Storm and starring Terry Serio and Chris Haywood. The screenplay concerns the three men arrested for the Sydney Hilton bombing.

The film was shot over 18 days. Ebsen Storm says he argued with the producer over the film but he still liked the end result a lot, calling it "one of those tax scam movies that ended up not being too bad".

References

External links

With Prejudice at Oz Movies

Australian crime drama films
1983 films
Films directed by Esben Storm
1980s English-language films
1980s Australian films